Tan Sri Lim Phaik Gan, known as P. G. Lim, (29 June 1915 – 7 May 2013)
 was a British-born Malaysian lawyer and diplomat. She was one of the first female lawyers to practice in Malaysia. Lim also served as Malaysia's first female ambassador. She served as Malaysia's Ambassador to the United Nations, Yugoslavia, Austria, and the European Economic Community during her diplomatic career.

Early life
Lim was born in London, United Kingdom in 1915. Her father, Lim Cheng Ean, was a lawyer and legislative councillor (Jalan Lim Chin Guan is named after her father). Her mother, Rosalind Hoalim, was British Guyanese. Lim was oldest of her siblings, who include Lim Kean Chye.

Career
Lim graduated from Convent Light Street in George Town, Penang. She was one of the first women from present-day Malaysia to receive a Master's of Law from Girton College, Cambridge.

In 1948, she acted as the defence attorney for Lee Meng, a Communist guerrilla leader arrested in Perak, Malayan Union. In 1968, she defended eleven young people who had been sentenced to death for collaborating with Indonesian forces during the Indonesia–Malaysia confrontation. She secured pardons for all eleven defendants from the Sultan of Johor and the Sultan of Perak.
In the 1960s, Lim was politically active as a member of the Labour Party of Malaya. She stood for
election in the seat of Sentul in 1964 under the banner of the Socialist Front, but lost the seat to the
Alliance Party.

The Malaysian Parliament was suspended in 1969 in the aftermath of the sectarian riots in the country. P. G. Lim was one of only two women to be appointed to the National Operations Council, which governed Malaysia from 1969 to 1971 in the aftermath of the riots. Members of the Council approved the Malaysian New Economic Policy in 1970, which was implemented in 1971.

In 1971, Malaysian Prime Minister Abdul Razak Hussein named Lim deputy permanent representative to the United Nations, a position which held the rank of Ambassador to the UN. Lim later continued her diplomatic career as the Malaysian Ambassador to Yugoslavia, Austria, and the European Economic Community.

Extra work
She served as the Director of the Kuala Lumpur Regional Centre for Arbitration until her retirement in 2001. Lim was awarded the Merdeka Award in 2009.

Death
Lim died in Perth, Western Australia, on 7 May 2013, at the age of 97. She was survived by two children, Wee Han Kim and Caryn Lim, and two grandchildren.

Honour
  : 
 Commander of the Order of Loyalty to the Crown of Malaysia (P.S.M.) - Tan Sri (2011)
 :
 Knight Commander of the Order of the Perak State Crown (D.P.M.P.) - Dato’ (1997)
 :
 Companion of the Order of the Defender of State (D.M.P.N.) - Dato’ (1997)

References

1915 births
2013 deaths
Malaysian women lawyers
Permanent Representatives of Malaysia to the United Nations
Ambassadors of Malaysia to Austria
Alumni of Girton College, Cambridge
Malaysian people of Chinese descent
Malaysian people of British descent
Malaysian people of English descent
Members of Lincoln's Inn
Naturalised citizens of Malaysia
Malaysian women diplomats
Malaysian women ambassadors
Labour Party of Malaya politicians
Malaysian socialists
Commanders of the Order of Loyalty to the Crown of Malaysia
Ambassadors of Malaysia to Belgium
British emigrants to Malaysia
20th-century Malaysian lawyers